No. 1301 (Meteorological) Flight was formed at RAF Delhi, in India, on 31 July 1943, by re-designating 2 Meteorological Flight. The flight was disbanded on 1 June 1946 at RAF Nagpur, in India. this Flight was re-formed on 14 June 1949 at RAF Negombo in Ceylon, from elements of No. 45 Squadron RAF, where it disbanded on 30 November 1951.

Allocated Aircraft
 
(This is a partial list)

July 1943 - June 1946
Blenheim IV Z7350

Hurricane IID HW720

June 1949 - November 1951
Bristol Brigand MET.3 VS817 VS820 (see 1949 image)

Havard IIB FT186

References

Lake, Alan. "Flying Units of the RAF".Airlife Publishing. Shrewsbury. 1999. 

1301 Flight
Military units and formations established in 1943
Royal Air Force